Following is a list of municipal presidents of Armería, in the Mexican state of Colima:

References 

Armería